The Duet free routine competition at the 2017 World Championships was held on 18 and 20 July 2017.

Results
The preliminary round was started on 18 July at 19:00. The final was held on 20 July at 11:00.

Green denotes finalists

References

Duet free routine